The Young Visiters or Mister Salteena's Plan is a 1919 novel by English writer Daisy Ashford (1881–1972). She wrote it when she was nine years old and part of its appeal lies in its juvenile innocence, and its unconventional grammar  and spelling. It was reprinted 18 times in its first year alone.

Plot 
Alfred Salteena, an "elderly man of 42", has invited 17-year-old Ethel Monticue to stay with him. They receive an invitation to visit Alfred's friend, Bernard Clark, which they readily accept. Bernard is "inclined to be rich". Shortly after their arrival, Ethel and Bernard become attracted to each other.

Alfred seeks Bernard's advice on how to become a gentleman. Bernard is doubtful that this can be managed, but writes an introduction to his friend the Earl of Clincham. Alfred excitedly rushes off to London to visit the Earl, leaving Ethel alone and unchaperoned with Bernard.

Lord Clincham lives, as many other aristocrats do, in "compartements" at the Crystal Palace. He agrees to assist Alfred and instals him in a subterranean "compartement", along with other "apprentice gentlemen". He invites Alfred to accompany him to a reception hosted by the Prince of Wales (the future King Edward VII), introducing Salteena as Lord Hyssops. The Prince is impressed, and promises to assist the trembling and overjoyed Salteena.

Bernard and Ethel fall in love and marry. Devastated by these events, Salteena marries a maid-in-waiting at Buckingham Palace. Lord Clincham also marries, but not very happily.

Composition and publication 
Ashford wrote the novel in an exercise book at the age of nine in 1890.  Full of spelling mistakes, each chapter was written as a single paragraph.  Many years later, in 1917 and aged 36, Ashford rediscovered her manuscript languishing in a drawer, and lent it to Margaret Mackenzie, a friend who was recovering from influenza. It passed through several other hands before it reached Frank Swinnerton, a novelist who was also a reader for the publishers Chatto and Windus.  Largely due to Swinnerton's enthusiasm for this piece of juvenilia, the book was published almost exactly as it had been written. J. M. Barrie, the creator of Peter Pan, agreed to write a preface.

Reception 
The book was so successful that it was reprinted 18 times in its first year alone. After its publication rumours soon started that the book was in fact an elaborate literary hoax and that it had been written by J. M. Barrie himself. These rumours persisted for years.

Adaptations 
A stage play of The Young Visiters by Mrs George Norman and Margaret Mackenzie was first performed in London in 1920 and transferred shortly afterwards to New York.  The New York production, at the Thirty-Ninth Street Theatre, received generally good reviews. One reviewer stated that
The Young Visiters ... has been turned into a play by the simple use of a pair of shears and a pot of paste. Probably no novel was ever so reverently dramatized since the world began.

A two-act musical comedy version, Quite A Young Girl by Alicen White, Martha D Coe, and Peter Colonna was written in 1960. Whilst it received the author’s blessing, they ultimately failed to find a producer.

A musical based on the book, by Michael Ashton and Ian Kellam, was produced in 1968; a feature-length film was made in 1984 starring Tracey Ullman and John Standing; and a television film version was made by the BBC in 2003, starring Jim Broadbent as Alfred Salteena, Lyndsey Marshal as Ethel Monticue and Hugh Laurie as Lord Bernard Clark. The screenplay was written by Patrick Barlow and it was directed by David Yates.

The original manuscript of The Young Visiters is held in the Berg Collection of New York Public Library.

Citations
Evelyn Waugh mentions the book in his novel A Handful of Dust (1934) as part of the childhood reading of his hero Tony Last.

The critic Edmund Wilson referred to the novel This Side of Paradise (1920) by his friend F. Scott Fitzgerald as "a classic in a class with The Young Visiters", meaning that Fitzgerald's book had a rather naive style.

References

External links

 
Works by Daisy Ashford at Internet Archive. Scanned original edition books.
The Young Visiters, at Project Gutenberg. Plain text and HTML formats.
"Daisy Ashford a Very Real Young Lady", 31 August 1919, The New York Times Book Review, Page 74

The Young Visiters at the Stone Soup archive.

1919 British novels
British novellas
Chatto & Windus books
British novels adapted into films
British novels adapted into plays
British novels adapted into television shows